Lee Young-ha (born 1 November 1997) is a South Korean professional baseball pitcher for the Doosan Bears of the KBO League. He graduated from Sunrin Internet High School and was selected for the Doosan Bears by the first draft in 2016. He joined the Doosan Bears in 2017.

References

External links 
 Career statistics and player information from the KBO League
 Lee Young-ha at Doosan Bears Baseball Club

Living people
1997 births
Doosan Bears players
KBO League pitchers